Northridge is the name of some places in the United States:

Northridge, Los Angeles, a community in California's San Fernando Valley
 California State University, Northridge
Cal State Northridge Matadors athletic teams from California State University, Northridge
 The Northridge earthquake of 1994
 Northridge, Clark County, Ohio
 Northridge, Montgomery County, Ohio
 Northridge Mall, Salinas, California
 Northridge Mall (Milwaukee)

High schools
Northridge High School in Middlebury, Indiana
Northridge High School (Dayton, Ohio)
Northridge High School (Layton, Utah)
Northridge Preparatory School in Niles, Illinois

People
Nigel Northridge (born 1956), British businessman